Netherlands v France in 1982 was the first women's rugby union test match. 1982 was the 50th anniversary of the Dutch Rugby Union and, as part of the celebrations, the Dutch invited the Association Française de Rugby Féminin (AFRF) to send a France women's national rugby union team to play a Netherlands women's national rugby union team. The match was covered by reporter Henk Hansen of the Dutch news magazine Panorama.

The match was played on 13 June 1982 at the Utrecht Sportpark Strijland, the home of Utrechtse Rugby Club, in Utrecht, Netherlands. The Netherlands were led by head coach Jopie Nessels and captained by their prop Lisa Groenedijk; France were led by head coach Clause Isoard. The match referee was Roel Wijnant of Belgium. The match resulted in a 4–0 victory for France.

Details

References

1981–82 in European rugby union
1981–82 in French rugby union
1982 in Dutch sport
1982 in women's rugby union
France women's national rugby union team
Women's rugby union in the Netherlands
Women's rugby union matches
1982 in Dutch women's sport